Laram Q'awa (Aymara larama blue, q'awa little river, ditch, crevice, fissure, gap in the earth, "blue brook" or "blue ravine", also spelled Laram Khaua, Laramkahua, Laramkhaua, Larancagua, Larancahua) may refer to:

 Laram Q'awa (Charaña), a mountain in the Charaña Municipality, Pacajes Province, La Paz Department, Bolivia
 Laram Q'awa (Pando), a mountain in the José Manuel Pando Province, La Paz Department, Bolivia
 Laram Q'awa (Parinacota), a mountain in the Parinacota Province, Arica y Parinacota Region, Chile
 Laram Q'awa (Río Blanco), a mountain near Río Blanco in the Charaña Municipality, Pacajes Province, La Paz Department, Bolivia